Sørvågen is a fishing village in Moskenes Municipality in Nordland county, Norway. It is located on the island of Moskenesøya in the Lofoten archipelago.  The village of Å lies just to the south. Moskenes Church is located just north of the village along European route E10.

Tourism

The village has several scenic and tourist attractions in and around the village.  It contains a local department of the Norsk Telemuseum (Norwegian Telecom Museum) which reflects the local history of telegraphy.

In 1861, the island became part of the  Lofoten telegraph line with a station in Sørvågen (which became the Sørvågen museum in 1914), being finally connected with Europe in 1867.

In 1906, a wireless telegraph system was installed in Sørvågen—the second in Europe after Italy—connecting Sørvågen with Røst.

References

External links
 

Moskenes
Villages in Nordland
Populated places in Nordland
Populated places of Arctic Norway